This article lists a selection of notable works created by Henry Moore. The listing follows the list of works within the book Sculpture by Henry Moore and links to images of the Henry Moore Artwork Catalogue.

Sculptures

Notes

References

External links
 

Sculptures by Henry Moore